Charles P. Melville (born 10 May 1951) is a British academic who has been Professor of Persian History at the University of Cambridge since 2008. He is the President of the British Institute of Persian Studies. He was one of the editors of The Cambridge History of Iran (volume 7) and History of Literature of Iran. He was educated in childhood at Wellington College before reading Arabic and Persian at Pembroke College, Cambridge; he went on to complete an M.A. in Islamic history at SOAS and a Ph.D. on historical seismicity in Iran.

He was a research assistant at Imperial College (1974–82) and Assistant Lecturer in Oriental Studies at Cambridge. He has been Professor of Persian History since 2008.

He is married to fellow academic Dr Firuza Abdullaeva, and he has two daughters: Josephine and Charlotte from his first marriage.

Publications
Every Inch a King: Comparative studies on kings and kingship in the ancient and medieval worlds, Leiden 2012
Persian Historiography. A History of Persian Literature X, London 2012.
The Russian perception of Khayyam: from text to image

See also
Jacques Duchesne-Guillemin
Ilya Gershevitch

References

External links
The British Institute of Persian Studies

Academics of the University of Cambridge
English orientalists
1951 births
Living people
Iranologists
Alumni of Pembroke College, Cambridge